This is a list of by-elections to the National Parliament of Solomon Islands since the First Parliament in 1976, with the names of the incumbent and victor and (when known) their respective parties. Where seats changed political party at the election, and where that change is known, the result is highlighted: yellow for a Democratic Party gain.

The source for most of this information is the parliamentary website.

First Parliament (1976–1980)

Second Parliament (1980–1984)
None.

Third Parliament (1984–1988)
None.

Fourth Parliament (1989–1993)

Fifth Parliament (1994–1997)

Sixth Parliament (1997–2001)

Seventh Parliament (2001–2005)

Eighth Parliament (2006–2010)

Ninth Parliament (2010–2014)

Eleventh Parliament (2019- ) 
Ethel Vokia replaced her husband Jaimie Vokia in North East Guadalcanal constituency.

Notable by-elections
The 1989 by-election in the North-East Guadalcanal constituency, prompted by Waita Ben Tabusasi's election as Speaker, resulted in a woman, Hilda Kari, being elected to Parliament for the first time.

Notes and references

 
Solomon